Burger Urge is a Brisbane, Australia-based Gourmet Burger chain founded by brothers Sean and Colby Carthew  in 2007, as a small local restaurant on Brunswick Street, Fortitude Valley.

Products 
Burger Urge's menu includes burgers, wings, fries, salads, and various sides. Vegan and gluten free options for people with restricted diets are also provided. Beverages include craft beers and cider, tap beer, milkshakes and soft drinks.

References

Further reading 

 Gold Coast Bulletin
 Courier Mail
 News.com.au
 Courier Mail
 The Sydney Morning Herald
 Gold Coast Bulletin
 Courier Mail
 The Huffington Post
 Yahoo! News
 Business News Australia
 Courier Mail
 The Morning Bulletin
 Brisbane Times

Fast-food chains of Australia
Hamburger restaurants
Restaurants established in 2007
2007 establishments in Australia
Companies based in Brisbane